Pimpinella major, common name greater burnet-saxifrage or hollowstem burnet saxifrage, is a herbaceous perennial plant in the genus Pimpinella belonging to the carrot family (Apiaceae).

Description
Pimpinella major reaches on average  in height. The stem is hollow, deeply grooved,  mostly glabrous, and generally branched and leafy.

The leaves are dark green, slightly glossy, ovate or oblong, short-stalked, feathery, more or less deeply cut, and usually pointed.

The flowers, usually hermaphrodite, range from white to glowing rose or soft-pink and are gathered in umbels  with 11 to 16 stalks.

The flowering period extends from June to August in its native habitat.

Subspecies 
Pimpinella major (L.) Huds. var. rubra Hoppe. ex Mérat

Also known as big red burnet, it is characterized by low growth and intense rose-colored petals. The stem is usually branched at the base, the branches are short and generally carry only one umbel.

 Pimpinella major var. rosea Lindeman
 Pimpinella major var. macrodonta (Pau) O. Bolòs & Vigo
 Pimpinella major var. orientalis (Gouam) Fi. et Paol.
 Pimpinella major var. dissecta (Sprengel) Fi. et Paol.
 Pimpinella major' var. bipinnata G. Beck

DistributionPimpinella major is widespread in central Europe and in the Caucasus and it is  naturalized in North America.

Habitat
It grows in burned forests, clearings, herb-rich areas, meadows, waysides, and wooded pastures.

Uses
The roots of Pimpinella major'' have been used internally in Austrian traditional medicine - as a tisane, in milk, or in herbal liqueurs - for the treatment of disorders of the respiratory tract, fever, infections, colds, and influenza.

Gallery

References

 Pignatti S. - Flora d'Italia - Edagricole – 1982 – Vil. II, pag. 190
 Tutin, T.G. et al. - Flora Europaea, second edition - 1993

External links
 Biolib
 Flores Alpes
 Acta plantarum
 Pimpinella major

major
Taxa named by Carl Linnaeus